The Ruza is a river in the Moscow Oblast in Russia, left tributary of the Moskva. The length of the river is 145 km. The area of its basin is 1,990 km². It usually freezes in November and stays under the ice until April.

References 

Rivers of Moscow Oblast